The Office of Special Projects may refer to:
Office of Special Projects, the original name for the Central Intelligence Agency's Office of Policy Coordination
Office of Special Projects, an elite division of the Naval Criminal Investigative Service that specializes in undercover assignments in the television series NCIS: Los Angeles
 Former United States Navy Special Projects Office